The following is a list of people who converted to Islam from a different religion or no religion. This article addresses only past professions of faith by the individuals listed, and is not intended to address ethnic, cultural, or other considerations. Such cases are noted in their list entries. The list is categorized alphabetically with their former religious affiliation, where known.

Based on alphabetical order: A-Z

A
Aminah Assilmi – former Southern Baptist preacher who converted to Islam while attempting to convert Muslims to Christianity
Hamza Ali Abbasi – former Pakistani actor, reverted to Islam from atheism
 Abd Al Malik - French rapper and poet
Kareem Abdul-Jabbar – retired basketball player & the NBA's all-time leading scorer
Ahmed Abdullah – American jazz trumpeter
Noor Hisham Abdullah – Malaysian Director-General of Health in leading the fight against the COVID-19 pandemic; born Yew Ming Seong.
Thomas J. Abercrombie – photographer and writer for National Geographic
Hasan Akbar (born Mark Fidel Kools) – American citizen, and Sergeant, diagnosed with psychiatric problems, later sentenced to death for an attack of resentment
Shaheed Akbar (a.k.a. The Jacka) – American rapper
Akhenaton – French rapper and producer; born Philippe Fragione
Baba Ali – Iranian-born American film developer, games developer, and businessman
Muhammad Ali – professional boxer, activist, and philanthropist
Sadeq Ali (born Sri Gaur Kishore Sen) – Bengali author
Nicolas Anelka – French football manager and former player
Lewis Arquette – American actor; father of actors David, Rosanna, Patricia, Alexis, and Richmond Arquette; son of Cliff Arquette
Muhammad Asad – Austro-Hungarian born Deputy Secretary in the Foreign Ministry of Pakistan, known for an English Translation of Quran.
Ziaur Rahman Azmi (born Banke Lal) – author, scholar, professor and former Dean of the Department of Hadith at Islamic University of Madinah

B
David Benjamin – Chaldean Catholic priest known for his book Muhammad in Bible.
B.G. Knocc Out – American rapper
Kristiane Backer – German television presenter.
A. George Baker – American Protestant clergyman who converted to Islam
Yasin Abu Bakr – leader of the Jamaat al Muslimeen, a Muslim group in Trinidad and Tobago
Mutah Beale – better known as Napoleon, former member of Tupac Shakur's rap group, the Outlawz
Lutfunnisa Begum (born Rajkunwari) – consort of the Nawab of Bengal
 Maurice Béjart – French choreographer
Robert "Kool" Bell – American musician
Mohammed Knut Bernström – Swedish ambassador
Wojciech Bobowski – Polish musician; Bible translator
Lauren Booth – British broadcaster, journalist and human rights activist
Charles Brooks, Jr. – first person in the United States to be executed using lethal injection, converted to Islam in prison, shortly before death
H. Rap Brown – American civil rights activist
Jonathan A.C. Brown – American Islamic scholar and assistant professor at Georgetown University
Maurice Bucaille – French family physician of King Faisalabad. It is disputed whether he ever converted, and if he did, whether he publicly declared his conversion. He is reported in a 2013 Arab News newspaper article, " In his excitement, he stood before the attendants and loudly said, "I have converted to Islam and believed in this Qur’an," however no references are given. In other articles and videos he was normally very careful not to claim allegiance to  any one faith.
Abdullah ibn Buhaina – American musician, also known as Arthur "Art" Blakey, American jazz drummer and bandleader; stopped being a practicing Muslim in the 1950s and continued to perform under the name "Art Blakey" throughout his career
Titus Burckhardt – Swiss writer and scholar

C
Celestino Caballero – Panamanian boxer and former Super Bantamweight Champion
Dave Chappelle – American comedian, screenwriter, television/film producer, actor, and artist
Kérim Chatty – Swedish bodybuilding stuntman
Ashley Chin – British actor and rapper
Zainab Cobbold – Scottish noblewoman
Louis du Couret – French explorer, writer and military officer

D
Uri Davis – Middle East academic and activist who works on civil rights in Israel, Palestinian National Authority and the Middle East
Bob Denard – French mercenary
Jeffrey Mark Deskovic – served 15-year wrongful imprisonment sentence
 Diam's – French rapper, born Mélanie Georgiades, converted in 2010 
 Nasreddine Dinet –  French orientalist painter, converted to Islam in 1908
Deso Dogg – former rapper who went to fight in Syria
Arnoud van Doorn – Dutch politician
Dutchavelli – British rapper

E
Dave East – American rapper and actor
Isabelle Eberhardt – Swiss explorer and writer
Keith Ellison – American politician and lawyer; first Muslim to be elected to Congress and the first African American representative from Minnesota.
Everlast – American rapper and singer-songwriter
Yusuf Estes – American preacher and founder of Guide US TV

F
Alys Faiz – human rights and peace activist; converted at the time of her marriage to Urdu poet Faiz Ahmed Faiz
Amanda Figueras – Spanish journalist for El Mundo and a writer
Michael Finton – radicalised individual, attempted to bomb the Paul Findley Federal Building to protest the Afghan war. Finton's local mosque condemned and disassociated from his ideologies
Jaime Fletcher – American film maker and founder of IslamInSpanish
Patrice Lumumba Ford (of the Portland Seven) – part of a group based in the U.S. Arrested for charges of terrorism, Ford's representative claimed the arrests were a governmental strategy to cover-up America's activities in foreign wars
Myriam François – English-French writer and broadcaster
Sultaana Freeman – Florida woman, popular in a local controversy for wearing face veil in drivers-license picture

G
Christian Ganczarski – German citizen who adopted radicalised ideologies, charged for conspiring 11 Sep attacks
Jemima Goldsmith – British socialite and ex-wife of Imran Khan
Juan Carlos Gomez – Cuban former Cruiserweight Boxing Champion
Khalid Gonçalves – Portuguese American actor and musician (born Paul Pires Gonçalves), convert to Islam from Catholicism
Abdur Raheem Green (born Anthony Green) – British Islamic preacher and founder of iERA
Philippe Grenier – French doctor; first Muslim MP in France
Jennifer Grout – American singer of Arabic music.
Gigi Gryce – American saxophonist, flutist, clarinetist, composer, arranger, and educator

H
Murad Wilfried Hofmann – German diplomat and author who converted from Catholic Christianity.

Walt Hazzard – former NBA player
Yusuf Hazziez – American musician, born Joseph Arrington, Jr.; formerly known professionally as Joe Tex
Aribert Heim – Austrian SS doctor, also known as Dr. Death
Tony Hussein Hinde – Australian-born Maldivian surfer and surfing pioneer who converted to Islam
Baba Ratan Hindi – Indian merchant
Lim Yew Hock – Singapore's second Chief Minister from 1956 to 1959
 Ibrahim Hooper (Douglas Hooper) – Islamic activist, spokesman for the Council on American-Islamic Relations (CAIR)
 Knud Holmboe – Danish journalist, author and explorer

I
Abdullah Ibrahim – South African jazz musician
Yusuf Islam – English singer-songwriter, instrumentalist and activist; born Steven Demetre Georgiou; known professionally as Cat Stevens
Abu Izzadeen – Hackney-born extremist and hate-preacher, spokesman for Al Ghurabaa
 Muhammad Hussain Inoki – Japanese retired professional wrestler, martial artist, politician, and promoter of professional wrestling and mixed martial arts.
 Kyrie Irving – American professional basketball player for the Brooklyn Nets of the NBA.

J
Stephen Jackson – American former professional basketball player who played 2400 seasons in the National Basketball Association (NBA)
Tiara Jacquelina – Malaysian actress
Ahmad Jamal – American jazz pianist
Maryam Jameelah – formerly Margret Marcus; author of many books covering several subjects, including modernism, sociology, history, jihad, theology and technology
Jan Janszoon – Dutch pirate, later sent his son to America, to become one of the first settlers of modern-day Brooklyn (called New Amsterdam at the time)
Larry Johnson – retired American professional basketball player
Gustave-Henri Jossot – French caricaturist, illustrator and Orientalist painter

K
Malik Kafur (d. 1316) – military commander of Alauddin Khalji
Kevin Lee – American professional mixed martial artist.
Dipika Kakar – Indian television actress
Frédéric Kanouté – French Malian former football player
Peter Kassig – American aid worker, formerly a Methodist, converted to Islam and changed name to Abdul-Rahman Kassig; taken hostage and killed by The Islamic State
 Mudzaffar Shah I of Kedah – founder of the Kedah Sultanate
 Khalid Kelly – former leader of Al-Muhajiroun in Ireland
Saida Miller Khalifa – British author, originally named Sonya Miller
Begum Om Habibeh Aga Khan (born Yvette Blanche Labrousse) – Miss France 1930, wife of Aga Khan III
Malik Jahan Khan (born Dhondia Wagh) – 18th-century military soldier and adventurer
Murshid Quli Khan (born Surya Narayan Mishra) – First Nawab of Bengal (r. 1717–1727)
Vladimir Khodov – militant zealot who converted to Islam in prison, and was the leader of the Beslan school hostage crisis
Abd al Haqq Kielan – Swedish cleric
Daud Kim— Muslim YouTuber
James Achilles Kirkpatrick – was the British Resident in Hyderabad
Rebeka Koha – Latvian weightlifter
Pavel Kosolapov – radical Russian rebel wanted by the Federal Security Service of Russia for suspected extremist activities

L
Colleen LaRose – American citizen, known for having adopted radicalised ideologies and conspiring a plot against Swedish cartoonist Lars Vilks
Yusef Lateef – American jazz musician
Johann von Leers – advisor to Mohamed Naguib and head of the Institute for the Study of Zionism
Gary Legenhausen – American philosopher and writer
Lin Nu – Chinese scholar of the Ming dynasty who converted to Islam after visiting Persia. He went on to marry a Persian or Arab woman and brought her back to Quanzhou in Fujian province
Lil Durk – American drill rapper
Omar Ong Yoke Lin (1917–2010) – Malaysian politician, former government minister and founder of the Malaysian Chinese Association

M
Malikussaleh (born Merah Silu) – founder of the Samudera Pasai Sultanate (r. 1267–1297)
Khalid Masood (born Adrian Russel Elms) – British citizen, with a history of once heavy-drinking and drug-use, later adopted extremist beliefs; perpetrator of the 2017 Westminster attack
Brandon Mayfield – American citizen, international lawyer, served in the United States Army Reserve. Was later issued a formal apology and $2 million settlement by the U.S. government after being falsely linked with the 2004 Madrid train bombings
Ali Mech – 13th-century tribal chief
Monica – former Indian film actress, starred predominantly in Tamil language films; converted to Islam in 2014
Moneybagg Yo – American rapper
Ali Shaheed Muhammad – member of A Tribe Called Quest
Idris Muhammad – American jazz musician
Jalaluddin Muhammad Shah (born Jadu) – Sultan of Bengal
John Allen Muhammad – convicted serial killer who carried out the Beltway sniper attacks of October 2002; later executed for his crimes
Anthony Mundine – Australian boxer; former two-time Super Middleweight champion

O
Sinéad O'Connor (Shuhada' Davitt) – Irish singer-songwriter; a former excommunicated Roman Catholic before becoming as Nondenominational Trinitarian Christian for several years and later [Sunni] Islam over theological reasons
Susanne Osthoff – German archaeologist and aid worker who had worked in Iraq since 1991, and was abducted en route to Abdil, for 3 weeks. She was later quoted to have said her kidnappers did not want ransom, but German humanitarian aid

P
José Padilla – born-American citizen, known for controversial Rumsfeld v. Padilla case. Padilla was arrested on allegations of intended terrorism, but was refused a trial in civilian courts, as well as a defense counsel and civilian court review; he was later convicted for 21 years in prison. Economist Paul Craig Roberts criticized the sentence as having "overthrown" the Constitution
Jay Palfrey— English YouTuber and travel blogger
Cory Paterson – Australian professional rugby league player
Wayne Parnell – South African cricketer
Thomas Partey – Ghanaian football player 
Christopher Paul – radicalised extremist, pleaded guilty to his affiliations and actions with al Qaeda
Abdul Wahid Pedersen – Danish Imam.
Charles John Pelham (Abdul Mateen) – 8th Earl of Yarborough
Bilal Philips – contemporary Muslim teacher, speaker, and author
Marmaduke Pickthall – British former Anglican clergyman and known for English Translation of Quran

Neil Prakash – Australian Islamic State group recruiter
Parameswara (king) – last king of Singapura and the founder of Malacca

Q
Abdullah Quilliam – English convert from Christianity to Islam, noted for founding England's first mosque and Islamic centre.

R
Raekwon – American rapper, born as Corey Woods
Rebeka Ibrahima – Latvian-born Qatari weightlifter, two time Junior World Champion and two time European Champion.
Rakhi Sawant – Indian dancer, model, actress.
A. R. Rahman – Indian composer, musician, singer-songwriter, producer and philanthropist; he converted to Islam along with other members of his family in 1989 at age 23, changing his name from A. S. Dileep Kumar Mudhaliar to Allah Rakha Rahman
Yuvan Shankar Raja – Indian musician; music director from Tamil Nadu
Richard Reid – British citizen, who adopted militant ideologies. Popularly known as the "Shoe Bomber" after unsuccessfully attempting to blow up an American Airlines flight
Nicky Reilly – resident of Plymouth, England, known for the 2008 Exeter attempted bombing; his psychologist says his mental disabilities (which included Asperger syndrome) made him vulnerable to radicalisation
MC Ren – American rapper and hip-hop producer
Franck Ribéry – France national football team player
Hamza Robertson (born Tom Robertson) – English singer
Jack Roche – British-born migrant in Sydney. Former member of the Jemaah Islamiyah sect, involved in its militant schemes, Roche later chose to divulge his information (of plots such as the September 11 attacks, the 2002 Bali bombings, etc.) to ASIO officers, but his calls were dismissed. Later convicted for 4-years, Roche has left the lifestyle behind but remains critical of the ASIO's failure to prevent the attacks

S
Hilal al-Sabi' – historian, bureaucrat, and writer of Arabic
Malik ul Salih – established the first Muslim state of Samudera Pasai
Ilich Ramírez Sánchez – formerly the world's most wanted terrorist; popularly known as "Carlos the Jackal"
Ibrahim Savant – radicalised individual arrested on suspected links with the 2006 UK transatlantic aircraft plot
Stephen Schwartz – American journalist, columnist, and author
Clarence Seedorf – Dutch former professional football players, widely seen as one of the greatest midfielders of all time.
Baba Shadi Shaheed (born Dharam Chand Chib) – former Governor of Kashmir and Kandahar 
Derrick Shareef – Chicago citizen, arrested for attempted terror plot in CherryVale Mall in Rockford
Sahib Shihab – American jazz saxophonist and flautist
Felix Siauw − Chinese-Indonesian Islamic cleric and author affiliated with Hizbut Tahrir Indonesia
Ubaidullah Sindhi – was a well known political, religious and revolutionary scholar
Robert Stanley (mayor) – British politician
Divine Styler – American hip hop musician
Abdalqadir as-Sufi (born Ian Dallas) – Scottish convert, a Shaykh of Instruction, leader of the Darqawi-Shadhili-Qadiri Tariqa, founder of the Murabitun World Movement.
Nahshid Sulaiman – alternative hip hop artist
Kabir Suman (born Suman Chattopadhyay) – Indian singer-songwriter, musician, music director, poet, journalist, political activist, TV presenter, and occasional actor; he stated, "I wanted to keep the name my parents gave me, so I kept Suman. I took the name Kabir after Sheikh Kabir, a Bengali Muslim poet who wrote Baishnab Padabali."
Mudzaffar Shah I of Kedah – Legendary king, said to be the first Sultan of Kedah, according to Hikayat Merong Mahawangsa. He was the last Hindu king of Kedah, styled Sri Paduka Maharaja Durbar Raja before his accession. After his conversion to Islam, he later became the founder of the Kedah Sultanate.
Shah Shahidullah Fari – British.

T
Malik Maqbul Tilangani (born Malla Yugandharudu) – Vizier of the Delhi Sultanate
Sharmila Tagore – Indian actress

Andrew Tate - retired American-British kickboxing champion and internet personality.
Sinan ibn Thabit – physician and son of Thābit ibn Qurra
William Thorson – former Swedish poker player
Conrad Tillard (born 1964) - American Baptist minister, radio host, author, civil rights activist, and politician; later converted back to Christianity
Apisai Tora – Fijian politician

Ofa Tu'ungafasi – New Zealand rugby player
Mike Tyson – American boxer; performer
Hamza Tzortis – British public speaker and researcher on Islam. He is known for his book: The Divine Reality: God, Islam and the Mirage of Atheism.

U
James Ujaama – social activist/entrepreneur from Seattle, known for helping black youth; established the Bly training camp; accused of militant intentions, but allegations were negated; later convicted for violating IEEPA, by installing software for a friend, to use on a computer owned by the Taliban

V
Joram van Klaveren – former Dutch MP, a politician who attempted to ban mosques and all Islamic practices from Holland; after working on a book to conclusively 'disprove' Islam, Joram's research (and discussions with Timothy Winter) drastically changed his views, he later converted to Islam
Jorvan Vieira – Luso-Brazilian football coach
Bryant Neal Vinas – Hispanic American, once joined al Qaeda training camps, later turning on them to help the US, in attempt to turn his life around; his prosecutors called him the "single most valuable cooperating witness" about Qaeda activities; his judge was angered when, after a 3-month sentence, the FBI refused to provide him witness-protection
Pierre Vogel – German former boxer, now an Islamic preacher

W
Sonny Bill Williams – New Zealand rugby player and heavyweight boxer
Jason Walters – Dutch citizen, former member of the Hofstad Network, convicted on acts of terror; currently writing his Master's thesis about de-radicalisation, and is an active speaker against radical zealotry, as an Analyst at Blue Water Intelligence
Alexander Russell Webb – American diplomat and writer
Dawud Wharnsby – Canadian singer songwriter.
Timothy Winter (a.k.a. Abdul Hakim Murad) – English convert who is the Director of Studies (Theology and Religious Studies) at Wolfson College, University of Cambridge.
G. Willow Wilson – American comics writer.
Michael Wolfe – American poet, author, and the President and Executive Producer of Unity Productions Foundation

X
Malcolm X (1925–1965) – African American civil rights leader and activist

Y
Hussein Ye – Malaysian preacher and Islamic scholar

Felixia Yeap – Malaysian supermodel, former Playboy Bunny
Mohammad Yousuf – former Pakistani cricketer
Hamza Yusuf – American Islamic preacher

Based on former religion 
 List of converts to Islam from Buddhism
 List of converts to Islam from Christianity
 List of converts to Islam from Hinduism
 List of converts to Islam from Judaism
 List of converts to Islam from nontheism
 List of converts to Islam from paganism
 List of converts to Islam from Zoroastrianism

See also
 List of converts to Buddhism
 List of converts to Christianity
 List of converts to Hinduism
 List of converts to Judaism
 List of converts to Sikhism
 List of former Muslims
 Lists of Muslims
 List of people by belief
 Religious conversion

References

Conversion to Islam
Converts to Islam
Converts
Islam, to